Mylothris subsolana is a butterfly in the family Pieridae. It is found in the Democratic Republic of the Congo and Uganda.

References

Butterflies described in 2001
Pierini